TAT-14 was the 14th consortium transatlantic telecommunications cable system. In operation from 2001 to 2020, it used wavelength division multiplexing.  The cable system was built from multiple pairs of fibres—one fibre in each pair was used for data carried in one direction and the other in the opposite direction.  Although optical fibre can be used in both directions simultaneously, for reliability it is better not to require splitting equipment at the end of the individual fibre to separate transmit and receive signals—hence a fibre pair is used.  TAT-14 used four pairs of fibres—two pairs as active and two as backup. Each fibre in each pair carried 16 wavelengths in one direction, and each wavelength carried up to an STM-256 (38,486,016 kbit/s as payload). The fibres were bundled into submarine cables connecting the United States and the European Union (United Kingdom, France, the Netherlands, Germany, and Denmark) in a ring topology.

By the time this cable went into operation, the expected long boom (term coined by Wired magazine) was already ending in the dot-com death. The overinvestment in transcontinental optical fiber capacity led to a financial crisis in private cable operators like Global Crossing.

In the cables leak released by WikiLeaks, it is revealed that the landing point in Katwijk, the Netherlands is included in a US Government list of critical infrastructure susceptible to terrorist attack.

Use of the cable was ceased on December 15, 2020, shortly after the Havfrue cable, whose main trunk also lands at Blaabjerg, was lit in November 2020. In 2021 the permanent dismantling of the system was begun.

Cable failure 

In November 2003, TAT-14 suffered two breaks within weeks of each other, first on the southern link between the US and UK, then on the link between France and the Netherlands which had been providing redundant service to the UK via the northern link through Denmark, resulting in disruption to Internet services in the United Kingdom.

On May 19, 2014, preliminary reports from hosting provider Digital Ocean suggested that TAT-14 was the cause for the disrupted services between the EU and the US.

References

External links

 TAT-14 Cable System (archived)

Transatlantic communications cables
Infrastructure completed in 2001
British Telecom buildings and structures
AT&T buildings
Deutsche Telekom
Vodafone buildings and structures
Verizon Communications
Sprint Corporation
KPN
Orange S.A.
Telenor
Level 3 Communications
KDDI
SoftBank Group
Telus
Telefónica
Rostelecom
Science and technology in Cornwall
Tata Communications
2001 establishments in Europe
2001 establishments in New Jersey
2020 disestablishments in Europe
2020 disestablishments in New Jersey